Otto Froitzheim (24 April 1884 – 27 October 1962) was a German tennis player. He won the singles and doubles titles at the World Hard Court Championships in 1912. He also won an Olympic Silver medal in singles in 1908 and was a finalist at Wimbledon in 1914.

Biography 
Froitzheim was born in Strasbourg, then part of the German Empire, on 24 April 1884. His father worked as a teacher at the local lyceum and his mother was the daughter of a doctor from the Rhineland. During his childhood, he practised several sports including athletics, swimming, ice skating and football. At the age of 16, he began playing tennis.

After graduating from school with the Abitur in 1901, Froitzheim began to study law at the University of Strasbourg. In 1902, he interrupted his studies for one year and served at the 138th infantry regiment at Strasbourg. In autumn 1903, following his military service, he continued his studies at the University of Bonn. In 1904, he passed the first law examination. In 1909, at an age of 25, he finished his studies with the second examination. Froitzheim then worked at the customs at Strasbourg.

Being kept a prisoner of war in an English detention camp for the duration of World War I, Frotzheim returned to Strasbourg in 1918 until Alsace-Lorraine was occupied by French forces. He then moved to Berlin, where he got a job in the police department with the task of fighting usury. Working as deputy police president at Cologne from 1923, he was assigned police president of Wiesbaden in autumn 1926. When the Nazi Party came to power in 1933, he was forced to quit because he refused to join the SA. However, with the support of Hermann Göring, who admired Froitzheim's successful international tennis career, Froitzheim was assigned vice president of the government at Aachen.

Froitzheim was engaged to Leni Riefenstahl, whom he had met in 1921, for some years and also had a love affair with Pola Negri in the 1920s. He died following a short illness in October 1962.

Tennis career 
In 1902, Froitzheim won his first tennis tournament, the championship of Alsace-Lorraine.  Before World War I, he won the International German Championships in 1907 and from 1909 to 1911. At the 1908 Summer Olympics he won a silver medal in the men's singles tournament. Another of his greatest victories was the title at the inaugural World Hard Court Championships on clay in the Paris suburb of Saint-Cloud in 1912, beating his compatriot Oscar Kreuzer in the final in four sets. In 1914, he advanced to the final at the Wimbledon Championships, losing to Australian Norman Brookes in five sets. He was ranked World No. 4 in 1914 by A. Wallis Myers of The Daily Telegraph.

At the end of July 1914, he and Oskar Kreuzer played the semifinal of the International Lawn Tennis Challenge at Pittsburgh against Australasia. When World War I broke out, the president of the local tennis club kept this from Froitzheim and Kreuzer as he didn't want to disrupt the match. The German team lost 0–5. On their way back to Germany, their Italian steamboat America was halted off Gibraltar by a British warship and they were placed in a prison in Gibraltar for several months before being sent to detention camps in England. While Kreuzer stayed at a camp near Leeds, officer Froitzheim was kept at Donnington Hall until the end of the war in 1918.

After the war, Froitzheim won the International German Championships again in 1921, 1922 and 1925. In 1927, at an age of 43, he reached the quarterfinals at the French Championships.

References

External links
 
 
 
 

1884 births
1962 deaths
German male tennis players
Olympic tennis players of Germany
Tennis players at the 1908 Summer Olympics
Olympic silver medalists for Germany
Olympic medalists in tennis
People from Alsace-Lorraine
Medalists at the 1908 Summer Olympics
Sportspeople from Strasbourg
Alsatian-German people
University of Strasbourg alumni
University of Bonn alumni
World War I civilian prisoners